The Wapiti Formation is a geological formation of the Western Canada Sedimentary Basin in northwestern Alberta, and northeastern British Columbia, Canada. Its deposition spanned the time interval from the lower Campanian through to the upper Maastrichtian, between approximately 80 and 68 Ma. It was named by G.M. Dawson in 1881, presumably for exposures along the lower part of the Wapiti River and downstream along the Smoky River in Alberta.

Dinosaur remains are among the fossils that have been recovered from the Cretaceous portion of the formation. The Wapiti Formation does not produce many fossils due to its limited surface exposure and accessibility, although two Pachyrhinosaurus bone beds have been productive.

Lithology 
The Wapiti Formation consists of interbedded sandstones, siltstones, shales and mudstones, with thin conglomerates, coal seams and bentonite beds. The sandstones are typically thick, pale grey, crossbedded and bentonitic. The middle part contains less sandstones, more mudstones, and fewer and thinner coals. The upper part contains thicker lenticular sandstones and more coals.

Depositional environment 
The Wapiti Formation was deposited in inland fluvial and floodplain environments, with local areas of lacustrine sediments. The sandstones were deposited mainly in fluvial channel environments, with siltstones, carbonaceous shales and coals accumulating in overbank settings.

Thickness and Distribution
The Wapiti Formation rests conformably on the marine shales of the Smoky Group. It is correlative with the entire sequence of the Belly River Group, Bearpaw Formation, Edmonton Group and Scollard Formation in south-central Alberta. In most areas it is unconformably overlain by glacial and post-glacial sediments of Quaternary age, or exposed at surface. In a few upland areas it is unconformably overlain by Paleogene gravel deposits.

Vertebrate paleofauna 

Indeterminate ankylosaurids, albertosaurines, pachycephalosaurids, ornithomimids, and saurolophines are known from Alberta. Corythosaurus is also known from the formation.  A caenagnathid is in the process of being described.

See also 
 List of dinosaur-bearing stratigraphic units

References 

Geologic formations of North America
Maastrichtian Stage of North America
Cretaceous–Paleogene boundary
Danian Stage
Paleogene geology of Wyoming
Paleogene Alberta
Sandstone formations
Mudstone formations
Fluvial deposits
Fossiliferous stratigraphic units of North America
Paleontology in Alberta
Paleontology in Wyoming